Juan de la Cerda may refer to:

 Juan de la Cerda, 2nd Duke of Medinaceli (1485–1544)
 Juan de la Cerda, 4th Duke of Medinaceli (c. 1514–1575)
 Juan de la Cerda, 5th Duke of Medinaceli (1544–1594)
 Juan de la Cerda, 6th Duke of Medinaceli (1569–1607)
 Juan de la Cerda, 8th Duke of Medinaceli (1637–1691)